is a Japanese politician of the Democratic Party of Japan, a member of the House of Representatives in the Diet (national legislature).

Career
A native of Fukuoka city and graduate of the Faculty of Letters at Keio University, Ryu was elected to the House of Representatives for the first time in 2003 after working at TV Asahi in the Marketing and Broadcasting departments.

His profile on the DPJ website also states that he serves as Chief Vice Secretary General and Deputy Chair, Election Campaign Committee within the party, and that his career also included the following positions:
Parliamentary Secretary of Education, Culture, Sports, Science and Technology
Senior Vice Chair, Diet Affairs Committee
Leader, Kanagawa Prefectural Headquarters, DPJ

Right-wing positions
Affiliated to the openly revisionist lobby Nippon Kaigi, Ryu was a supporter of right-wing filmmaker Satoru Mizushima's 2007 revisionist film The Truth about Nanjing, which denied that the Nanking Massacre ever occurred, and among the people who signed ‘THE FACTS’, an ad  published in The Washington Post on June 14, 2007, in order to protest against United States House of Representatives House Resolution 121, and to deny the existence of sexual slavery for the Imperial military ('Comfort women').

Ryu gave the following answers to the questionnaire submitted by Mainichi to parliamentarians in 2012:
in favor of the revision of the Constitution
in favor of right of collective self-defense (revision of Article 9)
in favor of reform of the National assembly (unicameral instead of bicameral)
in favor of reactivating nuclear power plants
in favor of zero nuclear power by 2030s
in favor of the relocation of Marine Corps Air Station Futenma (Okinawa)
in favor of evaluating the purchase of Senkaku Islands by Japan
in favor of a strong attitude versus China
against the reform of the Imperial Household that would allow women to retain their Imperial status even after marriage
against the participation of Japan to the Trans-Pacific Partnership
against a nuclear-armed Japan

References

External links 
  in Japanese.

Members of the House of Representatives (Japan)
Keio University alumni
Living people
1965 births
People from Fukuoka
Members of Nippon Kaigi
Democratic Party of Japan politicians
Nanjing Massacre deniers
21st-century Japanese politicians